The Municipality of Divača is a municipality in the Littoral region of Slovenia, near the Italian border. The seat of the municipality is the town of Divača. The municipality was established on 6 November 1994, when the former Municipality of Sežana was dissolved into four smaller municipalities (Divača, Hrpelje-Kozina, Komen, and Sežana). Škocjan Caves, a UNESCO World Heritage Site, is located in the municipality.

Settlements
In addition to the municipal seat of Divača, the municipality also includes the following settlements:

 Barka
 Betanja
 Brežec pri Divači
 Dane pri Divači
 Dolenja Vas
 Dolnje Ležeče
 Dolnje Vreme
 Famlje
 Gabrče
 Goriče pri Famljah
 Gornje Ležeče
 Gornje Vreme
 Gradišče pri Divači
 Kačiče-Pared
 Kozjane
 Laže
 Matavun
 Misliče
 Naklo
 Otošče
 Podgrad pri Vremah
 Potoče
 Senadole
 Senožeče
 Škocjan
 Škoflje
 Vareje
 Vatovlje
 Vremski Britof
 Zavrhek

Notable people
Notable people that were born in the Municipality of Divača include:
Rudolf Cvetko (1880–1977), Olympic fencer
Bogomir Magajna (1904–1963), writer and psychiatrist
Ita Rina (1907–1979), actress
Danilo Zelen (1907–1941), anti-Fascist insurgence leader

References

External links 

 Municipality of Divača on Geopedia
 Municipal website

 
1994 establishments in Slovenia
Divaca